Princess Charming is a German reality dating show that premiered on May 25, 2021, streaming on premium sector of RTL+ and began airing on October 29, 2021, on television on VOX. It is streaming on RTL+, operated by the RTL media group, in German. The show features women-identifying and non-binary contestants and is modeled after Prince Charming (started in 2019). Princess Charming was hailed as an example of German TV shows becoming more inclusive by Deutsche Welle.

On June 22, 2021, RTL+ officially renewed the series for a second season which premiered on June 14, 2022.

Format 
The original concept of Princess Charming, opening casting calls in October 2020, was to have a bisexual female lead, while the contestants were supposed to be lesbian or bisexual women and heterosexual men. However, the channel, in response to audience and applicant requests, changed the show concept to focus on a lesbian lead in December of the same year.

Unlike The Bachelor's "rose ceremony" or Prince Charming's black tie ceremony, contestants are eliminated if they are asked by the Princess Charming to take off and return the necklace they had previously been given.

Seasons

Season 1 
The first season premiered on May 25, 2021 on RTL+ and premiered on October 29, 2021 on VOX, with Irina Schlauch as the first Princess Charming, or show lead. Irina is a lawyer from Cologne who enjoys action sports and soccer and has a twin sister. Irina, 30, said in an interview that she is a fan of Prince Charming and wanted to "create more visibility and acceptance" for lesbian women through the show's format. The season, which was filmed on the Greek island of Crete, was composed of nine episodes and one reunion special.

At the Reunion, Irina and Lou announced they did not become a couple after the finale.

Contestants

Contestant Progress 

  The contestant went on a Group date with the Princess.
  The contestant went on both a Group date and a Single date with the Princess.
  The contestant went on a Single date with the Princess
  The contestant stayed a night together with the Princess.
  The contestant went on a Double date with the Princess and another contestant.
  The contestant quit the competition.
  The contestant was disqualified.
  The contestant had to give up her necklace and was eliminated.
  The contestant was the runner up.
  The contestant won Princess Charming.

Season 2
The Princess Charming of the second season, 28-year-old project leader Hanna Sökeland from Hanover, was introduced on April 21, 2022. The second season began airing on June 14, 2022 on RTL+. VOX initially broadcast the season, releasing each episode one week after its debut on RTL+. However, VOX stopped airing the season after the first two episodes due to low ratings. This also meant that the season could only be watched by RTL+ subscribers, since the "catch-up offer" (meaning the episodes were available for free on the RTL+ website for a few days after airing on VOX) expired due to VOX removing the show from its schedule.

At the Reunion, Hanna and Jessica announced they were still together (as of August 2022).

Contestants

Contestant Progress 

  The contestant went on a Group date with the Princess.
  The contestant went on both a Group date and a Single date with the Princess.
  The contestant went on a Single date with the Princess
  The contestant stayed a night together with the Princess.
  The contestant quit the competition.
  The contestant had to give up her necklace and was eliminated.
  The contestant was the runner up.
  The contestant won Princess Charming.

Notes

References 

German reality television series
2021 German television series debuts
2020s German television series
German-language television shows
German LGBT-related television shows
2020s LGBT-related reality television series
Dating and relationship reality television series